The Democratic Action Party or Parti Tindakan Demokratik is a centre-left political party in Malaysia.

Democratic Action Party or Democratic Action may also refer to:

Current parties
Democratic Action Party (Kenya) or DAP–K
Democratic Action Party (Moldova) or Partidul «Acţiunea Democratică» (PAD)
Democratic Action (Philippines) or Aksyon Demokratiko
Democratic Action (Venezuela) or Acción Democrática (AD)

Former parties
Action démocratique du Québec, Canada, 1994–2012
Democratic Action Party (Malta), 1947–c.1950
Democratic Action Party (Panama) or Partido Acción Democrático (PAD)
Democratic Action Party (Spain), 1981–1983

See also
Party of Democratic Action (disambiguation)
Democratic Party (disambiguation)
Action Party (disambiguation)